The Voice was a Norwegian radio station with a rhythmic CHR format.

It was owned by Bauer Media AS. The Voice broadcast in Oslo and Bergen. The station's target audience was the 15-24 age group.

The Voice brand in Norway was also used for The Voice TV channel. Sweden, Finland, Bulgaria and Denmark have their versions of the network: The Voice (radio station). 

The Voice (Norway) was shut down in 2015.

References

Radio stations in Norway
ProSiebenSat.1 Media
Radio stations disestablished in 2015
Defunct mass media in Norway